Nikos Psychogios (born 25 February 1989) is a professional Greek football player, currently playing for Aris Thessaloniki in the Football League 2.

Club career
He started his career at Iraklis, without making a single league appearance for the club. In 2009, he signed for Beta Ethniki side Olympiakos Volou on a two-year loan. His team won the 2009–10 Beta Ethniki championship and won promotion to the 2010–11 Superleague, with him making 24 appearances and scoring 2 goals. He signed for current club Aris Thessaloniki on 23 August 2012

Controversy
There was some controversy surrounding the loan move of Nikos to Olympiakos Volou. Olympiakos initially announced that they acquired the player on a full transfer, with Nikos signing a two-year contract. The situation was cleared up on 9 February 2011, when the Hellenic Football Federation confirmed that the player was on loan to the club, and he would have to move back to Iraklis after the season was over.

References

External links
 

1989 births
Living people
Greek footballers
Super League Greece players
Iraklis Thessaloniki F.C. players
Doxa Drama F.C. players
Olympiacos Volos F.C. players
Aris Thessaloniki F.C. players
Association football defenders
People from Chalkidiki
Footballers from Central Macedonia